Panic Attack! is a hand-drawn, hand-painted animated short by Eileen O'Meara. It was jury-selected for Aspen Shortsfest, Palm Springs ShortFest, Florida Film Festival, Anim'est and Raindance Film Festival.

Awards 
 First Prize, Short Film, Bilderbeben, Filmhaus Bielefeld, Germany
 First Prize, Animation, Benedictine Film Festival
 First Prize, Animation, Huntington Beach Film Festival
 First Prize, Animation, Queens World Film Festival
 First Place, Animated/Experimental/Alternative Media, KinoDrome International Motion Picture Festival
 Best Animation, Cinema Perpetuum Mobile International Film Festival, Minsk, Belarus
 Jury Prize for Animation, Jaipur International Film Festival 
 Popular Jury Award, Lobo Fest, Brazil
 Best Experimental Short, Brooklyn Women's Film Festival
 Best Short Film, PUSH! Film Festival
 Best Animated Short, 6 on Nebraska, Cape Town, South Africa
 Best International Short Film, Kinomorphia Film Festival, Sofia, Bulgaria
 Best International 2D Short, Carton International Animation Festival La Tribu, Buenos Aires
 Francie Award, Animation, Clones Film Festival
 Spirit Award, Animation, Brooklyn Film Festival
 Best Animation Film, Splice Film Fest
 Platinum Remi Award, Cel Animation, WorldFest-Houston International Film Festival
 Professional Animation Award, St. Francis College Women's Film Festival
 Audience Choice Award for Animation, Splice Film Fest
 Jury Award for Short Film under 3 minutes Preview Film Festival, Barcelona
 Solé Tura Award, Brain Film Festival
 Jury Mention for Best International Film, Beirut International Women Film Festival
 Best Genre-Bender, Sunrise 45 Film Festival
 Golden Sausage, Orscheler FilmFest
 Honorable Mention, James River Short film Festival
 Honorable Mention, Muestra Intergalactica, Saltillo, Mexico
 Special Mention, Animation, Pentedattilo Film Festival
 Special Mention, Orvieto Cinema Fest, Orvieto, Umbria, Italy
 Special Mention, Saint Petersburg International Film Festival, Russian Federation
 Special Mention, London-Worldwide Comedy Short Film Festival
 Special Mention, UK Seasonal Short Film Festival
 Cortos Ganadores, Special Mention, Festicine Pehuajo

See also 
That Strange Person
Agnes Escapes from the Nursing Home

References 

 Panic Attack! Lake Champlain International Film Festival article by Nathan Judd
 We Are Moving Stories: Interview
 Panic Attack! Review by Steve Kopian, Unseen Films
 Panic Attack! Review by Justin Sanchez, Mulderville Court Metrages

External links 
 
 Panic Attack! Website
 INDIE-EYE Cinema Review (in Italian)
 Panic Attack! Aspen Film
 Panic Attack! Florida Film Festival

American animated short films
American avant-garde and experimental films
American independent films
2010s animated short films
2016 animated films
2016 films
2010s avant-garde and experimental films
2010s American films